William Steuart (1780 – February 12, 1839) was a stone mason in colonial Maryland, and Mayor of Baltimore from 1831 to 1832. He was a lieutenant colonel in the United States Army during the War of 1812, and saw service during the Battle of Baltimore,  where he commanded the 38th United States Infantry foot regiment.

Personal life
Steuart was born in 1780 in Baltimore, Maryland to Robert Steuart. He was brought up as a stonemason by his father and his uncle Hugh and became a Freemason, joining Concordia Lodge No. 13. He married Elizabeth Hagerty of Alexandria, Virginia and had five sons and two daughters.

War of 1812

During the War of 1812 Steuart served in the United States Army as Lieutenant Colonel of the 38th United States Infantry foot regiment, commanding a force of around 600 men. Steuart was present at the Battle of Baltimore, during which the American forces prevailed against the British bombardment of Fort McHenry, with Steuart's regiment "occupying the exposed and shelterless position beyond the outer ditch."

Politics and business
After the War of 1812, Steuart was elected as a delegate to the Maryland Assembly, and later became Mayor of Baltimore from 1831 to 1832.
Steuart was Mayor of Baltimore for one term only, serving during the unexpired term of Mayor Jacob Small, who resigned his office on March 31, 1831 

Steuart was a building contractor and he prepared the stone work for the Washington Monument (Baltimore). In addition he worked on the Court House erected in 1805 (since demolished), and other large buildings of the time.

He also held a number of other civil offices in State and City government, in addition to being a member of the Vigilant Fire Company. He was appointed to the office of City Collector a few days before his death.

See also
 Colonial families of Maryland
 List of mayors of Baltimore, Maryland
 Province of Maryland

Notes

References
Andrews, Matthew Page, History of Maryland, Doubleday Doran & Co, New York City (1929).
Brugger, Robert J., p.109, Maryland, A Middle Temperament: 1634-1980 Retrieved August 2010
  Griffith, Thomas Waters, Annals of Baltimore, 1815 Retrieved August 2010
  Kilty, John, p.270, The land-Holder's Assistant, and Land-Office Guide Retrieved August 2010
 Nelker, Gladys P., The Clan Steuart, Genealogical Publishing (1970).
 Papenfeuse Edward C., and others, A Biographical Dictionary of the Maryland Legislature, 1635-1789, The Johns Hopkins University Press, 2009. 
 Richardson. Hester Dorey, Side-Lights on Maryland History: With Sketches of Early Maryland Families, Williams and Wilkins (1913). ASIN: B000VAWR4Q
 Steuart, Richard Sprigg, Dr. George Steuart of Annapolis and Doden, Anne Arundel County and his descendants, S.N. 1955, ASIN: B0007GTCFG
 Yentsch, Anne E, p.387, A Chesapeake Family and their Slaves: a Study in Historical Archaeology, Cambridge University Press (1994) Retrieved August 2010

External links
 Steuart in ''Niles Weekly Register Volume 52, 1837 Retrieved August 2010
 Steuart at politicalgraveyard.com Retrieved August 2010
 William Steuart at www.msa.md.gov Retrieved March 2011

Mayors of Baltimore
People of colonial Maryland
People of Maryland in the American Revolution
William
People from Anne Arundel County, Maryland
1754 births
1838 deaths
Maryland in the American Revolution
William